Michael Edgeworth McIntyre FRS (born 28 July 1941) is a mathematician and Professor Emeritus of Atmospheric Dynamics.

McIntyre has contributed to the fundamental understanding of geophysical fluid dynamics in the Earth's atmosphere, oceans and the Sun's Interior. He is a Fellow of the Royal Society and is the holder of the Carl-Gustaf Rossby Research Medal, the highest honour of the American Meteorological Society, and the Julius Bartels Medal of the European Geophysical Society.

Books
In 2021, he published a book, titled "Science, Music, and Mathematics: The Deepest Connections"  which draws on his experience as a musician as well as a scientist.  A wide variety of topics is covered including, for instance, how the skilful use of language can be informed by the way music works, and what science can and cannot tell us about the climate problem and its uncertainties.

References

1941 births
Fellows of the Royal Society
Living people